Helena Gloag (23 February 1909 – 15 June 1973) was a Scottish actress.

She had roles as the grandmother in the television series My Ain Folk and appeared in films such as The Prime of Miss Jean Brodie, Ring of Bright Water, Country Dance and Scrooge.

Partial filmography

References

External links
IMDB entry

1973 deaths
Scottish film actresses
1909 births
20th-century Scottish actresses